Gastón Rodrigo Alvite Duarte (born 9 March 1996) is a Uruguayan footballer who plays as a forward for Racing Club in the Uruguayan Primera División.

References

External links
Profile at Football Database

1996 births
Living people
Racing Club de Montevideo players
Deportivo Maldonado players
Uruguayan Primera División players
Uruguayan footballers
Association football forwards